Maculonaclia is a genus of moths in the subfamily Arctiinae. The genus was erected by Paul Griveaud in 1964.

Species
Some species of this genus are:
Maculonaclia altitudina Griveaud, 1964
Maculonaclia ankasoka Griveaud, 1964
Maculonaclia bicolor (Rothschild, 1911)
Maculonaclia bicolorata Griveaud, 1967
Maculonaclia brevipennis Griveaud, 1964
Maculonaclia buntzeae Griveaud, 1964
Maculonaclia delicata Griveaud, 1964
Maculonaclia dentata Griveaud, 1964
Maculonaclia douquettae Griveaud, 1973
Maculonaclia elongata Griveaud, 1964
Maculonaclia flamea Griveaud, 1967
Maculonaclia florida (de Joannis, 1906)
Maculonaclia griveaudi Viette, 1987
Maculonaclia grjebinei Griveaud, 1964
Maculonaclia itsikiorya Griveaud, 1969
Maculonaclia lambertoni Griveaud, 1964
Maculonaclia leopardina (Rothschild, 1911)
Maculonaclia lokoba Griveaud, 1964
Maculonaclia matsabory Griveaud, 1967
Maculonaclia minuscula Griveaud, 1973
Maculonaclia muscella (Mabille, 1884)
Maculonaclia nigrita Griveaud, 1964
Maculonaclia obliqua Griveaud, 1964
Maculonaclia obscura Griveaud, 1967
Maculonaclia parvifenestrata Griveaud, 1964
Maculonaclia petrusia Griveaud, 1967
Maculonaclia sanctamaria Griveaud, 1964
Maculonaclia tampoketsya Griveaud, 1969
Maculonaclia tenera (Mabille, 1879)
Maculonaclia truncata Griveaud, 1964
Maculonaclia viettei Griveaud, 1964

Former species
Maculonaclia agatha (Oberthür, 1893)

References

Arctiinae